La Ghirlandata ("The Garlanded Woman") is an 1873 painting by English painter and poet Dante Gabriel Rossetti. It is currently in the collection of the Guildhall Art Gallery in London, United Kingdom. The model who sat for the painting was Alexa Wilding. May Morris was the model for both angel heads in the top corners of the painting.

A conservation programme funded by the Bank of America Art Conservation Project has proposed on 2019. Before the project started, UCL updtaed the previous imaging studies by Art Analysis & Research by using a newly installed hyperspectral imaging system designed and manufactured by ClydeHSI.

References
 l

Paintings by Dante Gabriel Rossetti
1873 paintings
Musical instruments in art
Collection of the Guildhall Art Gallery